John Biggers may refer to:

 John D. Biggers (1923–2018), British reproductive biologist
 John T. Biggers (1924–2001), American muralist